Ras guanyl-releasing protein 3 is a protein that in humans is encoded by the RASGRP3 gene.

Function 

Members of the RAS (see HRAS; MIM 190020) subfamily of GTPases function in signal transduction as GTP/GDP-regulated switches that cycle between inactive GDP- and active GTP-bound states. Guanine nucleotide exchange factors (GEFs), such as RASGRP3, serve as RAS activators by promoting acquisition of GTP to maintain the active GTP-bound state and are the key link between cell surface receptors and RAS activation (Rebhun et al., 2000).

Interactions 

RASGRP3 has been shown to interact with PRKCD.

References

Further reading 

 
 
 
 
 
 
 
 
 
 
 
 
 

EF-hand-containing proteins